Kanu Gandhi (1928 – 7 November 2016) was an Indian scientist and son of Ramdas Gandhi, thus a grandson of Mahatma Gandhi.

He studied at Massachusetts Institute of Technology, graduating with a master's degree in civil engineering in 1963. Later he worked for NASA and United States Department of Defense on aircraft design. He moved back to India with his wife in 2014. Gandhi died in a private hospital in Surat.

Career 
In 1963, Gandhi graduated from the Massachusetts Institute of Technology with a master's degree in civil engineering. Later he worked for NASA and United States Department of Defense on aircraft design. His wife Shivalaxmi was a professor and researcher in Boston Biomedical Research Institute. They had no children. In 2014 they moved back to India. He died in a private hospital in Surat.

References

2016 deaths
1928 births
Scientists from Gujarat
Kanu
American people of Indian descent
People from Surat